Germany ranked 20th in the world in life expectancy in 2014 with 76.5 years for men and 82.1 years for women. It had a very low infant mortality rate (4.3 per 1,000 live births), and it was eighth place in the number of practicing physicians, at per 1,000 people (3.3).

A new measure of expected human capital calculated for 195 countries from 1990 to 2016 and defined for each birth cohort as the expected years lived from age 20 to 64 years and adjusted for educational attainment, learning or education quality, and functional health status was published by The Lancet in September 2018. Germany had the twenty-fourth highest level of expected human capital with 25 health, education, and learning-adjusted expected years lived between age 20 and 64 years.

The Human Rights Measurement Initiative finds that Germany is achieving 90.0% of what should be possible for the right to health, based on their level of income.

Epidemiology

At the end of 2004, some 44,900 Germans, or less than 0.1 percent of the population, were infected with human immunodeficiency virus/acquired immune deficiency syndrome (HIV/AIDS). In the first half of 2005, German health authorities registered 1,164 new infections; about 60 percent of the cases involved homosexual men. Since the beginning of the HIV/AIDS epidemic, about 24,000 Germans have died from the disease.

According to a 2013 micro-census survey, 24.5% of the German population aged 15+ are smokers (29 percent in men, 20 percent in women). Among the 18- to 25-year-old age group, 35.2% are smokers.

Obesity in Germany has been increasingly cited as a major health issue. A 2007 study shows Germany has the highest number of overweight people in Europe. However, the United Kingdom, Greece and certain countries in Eastern Europe have a higher rate of "truly obese" people. German Federal Office of Statistics ranks Germany as the 43rd fattest country in the World with a rate of 60.1%.

For home care for the elderly, the family caregivers receive a relief of €125 per month. The actual amount of relief can be found in the Social Insurance Code under § 45b SGB XI.

In 2015 it was estimated that 11.52% of the population has diabetes type 2, costing about $4,943 per person per year.

A report published by the EU Commission in 2015 found that the life expectancy in Germany was glaringly lower than that in other big European Union countries such as Italy, France and Spain, though it was still higher than the average life expectancy of the whole of EU. The report had some other interesting findings about health in Germany. Incidence of cardiovascular diseases had been declining since 2000 while cancer as a cause of death was on the increase. Incidence of dementia too was on the rise. The number of deaths due to Alzheimer's disease rose from 6,000 in 2000 to 35,000 in 2014.

The number of cases of scabies rose from under 1000 in 2011 to more than 5500 in 2017, the authorities do not know why prevalence is rising.

History
At the end of the nineteenth century Berlin had the highest urban density of any city in Europe. Only 8% of dwellings in the city had a toilet. There were repeated outbreaks of cholera and typhus. Rudolf Virchow promoted sewage works, called Rieselfelder, after the cholera epidemic of 1868. In 1871 a smallpox epidemic killed 6478 people. Virchow estimated that 5% of the Berlin population were infected by venereal disease.

Tuberculosis was estimated to be the cause of about 15% of all deaths in Prussia in 1860.

From 1883 Otto von Bismarck introduced several items of social legislation: the Health Insurance Bill of 1883, Accident Insurance Bill of 1884, and the Old Age and Disability Insurance Bill of 1889.

Vaccination
In Germany, the Standing Committee on Vaccination is the federal commission responsible for recommending an immunization schedule. The Robert Koch Institute in Berlin (RKI) compiles data of immunization status upon the entry of children at school, and measures vaccine coverage of Germany at a national level. Founded in 1972, the STIKO is composed of 12–18 volunteers, appointed members by the Federal Ministry for Health for 3-year terms. The independent advisory group meets biannually to address issues pertaining to preventable infectious diseases. Although the STIKO makes recommendations, immunization in Germany is voluntary and there are no official government recommendations. German Federal States typically follow the Standing Vaccination Committee's recommendations minimally, although each state can make recommendations for their geographic jurisdiction that extends beyond the recommended list. In addition to the proposed immunization schedule for children and adults, the STIKO recommends vaccinations for occupational groups, police, travelers, and other at risk groups. Vaccinations recommendations that are issued must be in accordance with the Protection Against Infection Act (Infektionsschutzgesetz), which regulates the prevention of infectious diseases in humans. If a vaccination is recommended because of occupational risks, it must adhere to the Occupational Safety and Health Act involving Biological Agents. In the event of vaccination related injuries, federal states are responsible for monetary compensation. Germany's central government does not finance childhood immunizations, so 90% of vaccines are administered in a private physician's office and paid for through insurance. The other 10% of vaccines are provided by the states in public health clinics, schools, or day care centers by local immunization programs. Physician responsibilities concerning immunization include beginning infancy vaccination, administering booster vaccinations, maintaining medical and vaccination history, and giving information and recommendations concerning vaccines.

See also
 Healthcare in Germany

References